Carlo Molinaris (born 19 September 1951) is a former Italian long jumper.

Career
Two-time national champion at senior level in long jump in 1973 and 1974.

Achievements

References

External links
 

1951 births
Living people
Italian male long jumpers